Judson Albert Timm (August 28, 1906 – December 23, 1994) was a college football player and coach. A native of Twin Falls, Idaho, he played for Robert Zuppke's Illinois Fighting Illini football teams at the University of Illinois at Urbana–Champaign, where he was a prominent halfback and a member of its 1927 national championship team. Timm scored in the Michigan game that year;  and was an All-Big Ten Conference selection. Timm served as the head football coach at Pennsylvania Military College—now known as Widener University—from 1930 to 1938 and at Moravian College from 1939 to 1941, compiling a career college football coaching record of 52–43–11.  He was also the head basketball coach at  Pennsylvania Military from 1930 to 1936 and again in 1937–38, tallying a mark of 58–54.  Timm was an assistant football coach at Yale University from 1942 to 1944, mentoring the backfield for the Yale Bulldogs football team under head coach Howard Odell.  He was later an assistant football coach and head track and field coach at Princeton University.

Early years
Timm was born on August 28, 1906 in Michigan to Albert Amos Timm and Gertrude Wolfinger.

Head coaching record

Football

References

External links

1906 births
1994 deaths
American football fullbacks
American football halfbacks
Basketball coaches from Idaho
Illinois Fighting Illini football players
Moravian Greyhounds football coaches
Princeton Tigers football coaches
Princeton Tigers track and field coaches
Widener Pride football coaches
Widener Pride men's basketball coaches
Yale Bulldogs football coaches
People from Twin Falls, Idaho
Players of American football from Idaho